KUBS (91.5 FM) is a high school radio station broadcasting a country music format. Licensed to Newport, Washington, United States, the station is currently owned by Newport Consolidated School District #56415.

References

External links

UBS
High school radio stations in the United States
Country radio stations in the United States
Pend Oreille County, Washington